Bedford is an unincorporated community in Bedford County, Tennessee, in the United States.

History
A post office called Bedford was established in 1869, and remained in operation until it was discontinued in 1908. The community was likely named from Bedford County.

References

Unincorporated communities in Bedford County, Tennessee
Unincorporated communities in Tennessee